In the late 1940s and 1950s the Australian National Quiz Championships were run and broadcast live by ABC Radio. The quiz was arranged to promote the federal government's security loans for post-war reconstruction.

Since 2007 the Australian Quiz Championship has been run by Quizzing Australia in conjunction with the World Quizzing Championship.

Winners

Individual

Multiple individual titles
9 - Issa Schultz
3 - Ross Evans

Pairs

Teams

External links
 Quizzing Australia
 World Quizzing Championship

References

Quiz games
Trivia competitions